Osinki is a rural locality (a village) in Fominskoye Rural Settlement, Gorokhovetsky District, Vladimir Oblast, Russia. The population was 5 as of 2010.

Geography 
Osinki is located on the Visha River, 46 km southwest of Gorokhovets (the district's administrative centre) by road. Istomino is the nearest rural locality.

References 

Rural localities in Gorokhovetsky District